Mount Sungay, also known as Mount Gonzales, is a mountain in the province of Cavite in the Philippines. The slopes of the mountain are the source of the San Cristobal River that flows from the mountain to Silang, Cavite down to its mouth at Laguna de Bay in Calamba, Laguna.

The mountain's former sharp peak and readily distinguishable shape made it a reliable landmark for bearing checks when sailing in and around Manila Bay during the early days of navigation.

Tagaytay Ridge
The ridge stretches west-southwest from Mount Sungay to Mount Batulao in Batangas province.

The ridge, which overlooks Taal Lake in Batangas province, is actually the northern rim of Taal Caldera. The northern slope of the ridge is gently rolling down slope till it reaches the sea level at Manila Bay, in contrast to the rapid drop in its southern slopes and east of Mount Sungay.

Tagaytay Ridge is part of the upland mountainous area of the province of Cavite, which include the communities of Tagaytay, Silang,  Amadeo,  Mendez,  Alfonso, Indang and southern part of Maragondon. The municipalities are situated at elevations above  with slopes of more than 2%.

The Tagaytay ridge also contains the Matang Tubig (Eye of the Water) spring which is used for irrigation and for powering a small hydroelectric plant. The 19th century artesian spring produces around 3000 gallons of water per minute.

Destruction
It was conical in shape with steep sides deemed "inaccessible", topped by distinct rock formations that resembled horns, (Tagalog: sungay), hence the name.

Mount Sungay was destroyed with the 1979 construction of First Lady Imelda Marcos's Palace in the Sky, a mansion originally intended as a guesthouse for former California Governor Ronald Reagan (who never arrived). This drastically changed the landscape of the Cavite highland, as the mountain was leveled to about half of its former prominence to accommodate the structure. The mansion remained unfinished after the People Power Revolution in 1986 that toppled the dictatorship of President Ferdinand Marcos. The new government renamed it the People's Park in the Sky, to show the excesses of the ousted regime.

People's Park in the Sky

The People's Park in the Sky, in now poised at the top of Mount Sungay, the highest point of the Province of Cavite. It overlooks four bodies of water – Taal Lake, Balayan Bay, Laguna de Bay and Manila Bay. Nearby mountains visible from Mount Sungay include Mount Makiling in Laguna-Batangas border; Mount Malepunyo and Mount Macolod in Batangas; and Mount Banahaw in Quezon.

A narrow road takes visitors near the top to the parking lot and entrance of the park. The mansion can be reached by a  hike or by a jeepney.

References

Mountains of the Philippines
Tagaytay
Landforms of Cavite
Stratovolcanoes of the Philippines